Heliamphora tatei (after George Henry Hamilton Tate) is a species of marsh pitcher plant endemic to Cerro Duida, Cerro Huachamacari and Cerro Marahuaca in Venezuela. It is closely related to H. macdonaldae, H. neblinae, and H. parva, and all three have in the past been considered forms or varieties of H. tatei. Like H. tatei, these species are noted for their stem-forming growth habit.

Putative natural hybrids between H. macdonaldae and H. tatei have been recorded in the southern part of Cerro Duida.

Infraspecific taxa
Heliamphora tatei var. macdonaldae (Gleason) Maguire (1978) [=H. macdonaldae]
Heliamphora tatei f. macdonaldae (Gleason) Steyerm. (1984) [=H. macdonaldae]
Heliamphora tatei var. neblinae (Maguire) Steyerm. (1984) [=H. neblinae]
Heliamphora tatei var. neblinae f. parva (Maguire) Steyerm. (1984) [=H. parva]
Heliamphora tatei f. tyleri (Gleason) Baumgartl (1993)

References

Further reading

 Jaffé, K., M.S. Blum, H.M. Fales, R.T. Mason & A. Cabrera (1995). On insect attractants from pitcher plants of the genus Heliamphora (Sarraceniaceae). Journal of Chemical Ecology 21(3): 379–384.  
 McPherson, S. 2007. Pitcher Plants of the Americas. The McDonald & Woodward Publishing Company, Blacksburg, Virginia.
 Nerz, J. (December 2004). Heliamphora elongata (Sarraceniaceae), a new species from Ilu-Tepui. Carnivorous Plant Newsletter 33(4): 111–116.
 Renner, S.S. (1989). Floral biological observations on Heliamphora tatei Sarraceniaceae and other plants from Cerro de la Neblina in Venezuela. Plant Systematics and Evolution 163(1–2): 21–30. 
 Wistuba, A., T. Carow & P. Harbarth (September 2002). Heliamphora chimantensis, a new species of Heliamphora (Sarraceniaceae) from the ‘Macizo de Chimanta’ in the south of Venezuela. Carnivorous Plant Newsletter 31(3): 78–82.

tatei
Flora of Venezuela
Flora of the Tepuis